Sir Frederick Henry Stewart  (16 January 1916 – 9 December 2001) was a Scottish geologist and academic who was a professor at the University of Edinburgh.

Background

He was born in Aberdeen on 16 January 1916, the son of Frederick Robert Stewart, a lecturer in engineering at Aberdeen University, and his wife, Hester Alexander.

He was educated at Fettes College and Robert Gordon's College. He earned his BSc in Zoology in three years at Aberdeen University. He followed this with a doctorate (PhD) in Geology at Emmanuel College, Cambridge, while also studying the geology of the Isle of Skye and the village of Belhelvie, Aberdeenshire.

Personal life

In 1945, Stewart married Mary Rainbow, (later to achieve recognition as the novelist Mary Stewart) whom he met whilst working in Durham. She outlived him, dying in 2014. There were no children.

Honours and awards

Honorary doctorates from the Universities of Aberdeen, Leicester, Heriot-Watt University, Durham, and Glasgow.
Fellow of the Royal Society of Edinburgh, 1957 
Elected a Fellow of the Royal Society (FRS) in 1964
Awarded the Lyell Medal by the Geological Society of London, 1970
Knighted 1974
Founding member of the World Cultural Council in 1981.

References

1916 births
2001 deaths
People from Argyll and Bute
People from Aberdeen
People educated at Fettes College
People educated at Robert Gordon's College
Scottish geologists
Academics of Durham University
Academics of the University of Edinburgh
Knights Bachelor
Founding members of the World Cultural Council
Fellows of the Royal Society of Edinburgh
Fellows of the Royal Society
Lyell Medal winners